Guihomar of Léon was the name of several Viscounts of Léon.

Guihomar I
Guihomar II
Guihomar III
Guihomar IV
Guihomar V
Guihomar VI

Viscounts of Léon
House of Léon